Shopov is a Bulgarian male surname, its feminine counterpart is Shopova. It may refer to:
Atanas Shopov (born 1951), Bulgarian weightlifter
Hristo Shopov (born 1964), Bulgarian actor
Ivan Shopov (born 1982), Bulgarian music producer, DJ and graphic artist
Ivan Shopov (curler) (born 1966), Bulgarian wheelchair curler
Khristo Shopov (1912–?), Bulgarian sports shooter
Naum Shopov (1930–2012), Bulgarian actor
Petar Shopov (born 1978), Bulgarian football player
Yanko Shopov (born 1954), Bulgarian Olympic wrestler

Bulgarian-language surnames